La Camocha is a former coal mine which is seven kilometers south of Gijon, Asturias, Spain. It was operated by Minas la Camocha SA, which is affiliated with González y Díez SA.

The former mining railway that once linked the coal mine of La Camocha to Veriña has been replaced by La Camocha Greenway, a trail for hikers and cyclists.

The trade union movement Comisiones Obreras (CC.OO.) was born in the La Camocha mine.

References

Coal mines in Spain
Buildings and structures in Asturias
Gijón
History of Asturias